Betlitsa is a rural locality (a settlement) and the administrative center of Kuybyshevsky District, Kaluga Oblast, Russia. Population:

References

Notes

Sources

Rural localities in Kaluga Oblast